Visual anthropology  is a subfield of social anthropology that is concerned, in part, with the study and production of ethnographic photography, film and, since the mid-1990s, new media. More recently it has been used by historians of science and visual culture. Although sometimes wrongly conflated with ethnographic film, visual anthropology encompasses much more, including the anthropological study of all visual representations such as dance and other kinds of performance, museums and archiving, all visual arts, and the production and reception of mass media.  Histories and analyses of representations from many cultures are part of visual anthropology: research topics include sandpaintings, tattoos, sculptures and reliefs, cave paintings, scrimshaw, jewelry, hieroglyphics, paintings and photographs. Also within the province of the subfield are studies of human vision, properties of media, the relationship of visual form and function, and applied, collaborative uses of visual representations.

Multimodal anthropology describes the latest turn in the subfield, which considers how emerging technologies like immersive virtual reality, augmented reality, mobile apps, social networking, gaming along with film, photography and art is reshaping anthropological research, practice and teaching.

History
Even before the emergence of anthropology as an academic discipline in the 1880s, ethnologists used photography as a tool of research. Anthropologists and non-anthropologists conducted much of this work in the spirit of salvage ethnography or attempts to record for posterity the ways-of-life of societies assumed doomed to extinction (see, for instance, the Native American photography of Edward Curtis)

The history of anthropological filmmaking is intertwined with that of non-fiction and documentary filmmaking, although ethnofiction may be considered as a genuine subgenre of ethnographic film. Some of the first motion pictures of the ethnographic other were made with Lumière equipment (Promenades des Éléphants à Phnom Penh, 1901). Robert Flaherty, probably best known for his films chronicling the lives of Arctic peoples (Nanook of the North, 1922), became a filmmaker in 1913 when his supervisor suggested that he take a camera and equipment with him on an expedition north. Flaherty focused on "traditional" Inuit ways of life, omitting with few exceptions signs of modernity among his film subjects (even to the point of refusing to use a rifle to help kill a walrus his informants had harpooned as he filmed them, according to Barnouw; this scene made it into Nanook where it served as evidence of their "pristine" culture). This pattern would persist in many ethnographic films to follow (see as an example Robert Gardner's Dead Birds).

By the 1940s and early 1950s, anthropologists such as Hortense Powdermaker, Gregory Bateson, Margaret Mead (Trance and Dance in Bali, 1952) and Mead and Rhoda Metraux, eds., (The Study of Culture at a Distance, 1953) were bringing anthropological perspectives to bear on mass media and visual representation. Karl G. Heider notes in his revised edition of Ethnographic Film (2006) that after Bateson and Mead, the history of visual anthropology is defined by "the seminal works of four men who were active for most of the second half of the twentieth century: Jean Rouch, John Marshall, Robert Gardner, and Tim Asch. By focusing on these four, we can see the shape of ethnographic film" (p. 15). Many, including Peter Loizos, would add the name of filmmaker/author David MacDougall to this select group.

In 1966, filmmaker Sol Worth and anthropologist John Adair taught a group of Navajo Indians in Arizona how to capture 16mm film. The hypothesis was that artistic choices made by the Navajo would reflect the 'perceptual structure' of the Navajo world. The goals of this experiment were primarily ethnographic and theoretical. Decades later, however, the work has inspired a variety of participatory and applied anthropological initiatives - ranging from photovoice to virtual museum collections - in which cameras are given to local collaborators as a strategy for empowerment.

In the United States, Visual Anthropology first found purchase in an academic setting in 1958 with the creation of the Film Study Center at Harvard's Peabody Museum of Archaeology and Ethnology. In the United Kingdom, The Granada Centre for Visual Anthropology at the University of Manchester was established in 1987 to offer training in anthropology and film-making to MA, MPhil and PhD students and whose graduates have produced over 300 films to date. John Collier, Jr. wrote the first standard textbook in the field in 1967, and many visual anthropologists of the 1970s relied on semiologists like Roland Barthes for essential critical perspectives. Contributions to the history of Visual Anthropology include those of Emilie de Brigard (1967), Fadwa El Guindi (2004), and Beate Engelbrecht, ed. (2007). A more recent history that understands visual anthropology in a broader sense, edited by Marcus Banks and Jay Ruby, is Made To Be Seen: Historical Perspectives on Visual Anthropology. Turning the anthropological lens on India provides a counterhistory of visual anthropology (Khanduri 2014).

At present, the Society for Visual Anthropology (SVA) represents the subfield in the United States as a section of the American Anthropological Association, the AAA.

In the United States, ethnographic films are shown each year at the Margaret Mead Film Festival as well as at the AAA's annual Film and Media Festival. In Europe, ethnographic films are shown at the Royal Anthropological Institute Film Festival in the UK, The Jean Rouch Film Festival in France and Ethnocineca in Austria. Dozens of other international festivals are listed regularly in the Newsletter of the Nordic Anthropological Film Association [NAFA].

Timeline and breadth of prehistoric visual representation
While art historians are clearly interested in some of the same objects and processes, visual anthropology places these artifacts within a holistic cultural context. Archaeologists, in particular, use phases of visual development to try to understand the spread of humans and their cultures across contiguous landscapes as well as over larger areas.  By 10,000 BP, a system of well-developed pictographs was in use by boating peoples and was likely instrumental in the development of navigation and writing, as well as a medium of storytelling and artistic representation. Early visual representations often show the female form, with clothing appearing on the female body around 28,000 BP, which archaeologists know now corresponds with the invention of weaving in Old Europe.  This is an example of the holistic nature of visual anthropology: a figurine depicting a woman wearing diaphanous clothing is not merely an object of art, but a window into the customs of dress at the time, household organization (where they are found), transfer of materials (where the clay came from) and processes (when did firing clay become common), when did weaving begin, what kind of weaving is depicted and what other evidence is there for weaving, and what kinds of cultural changes were occurring in other parts of human life at the time.

Visual anthropology, by focusing on its own efforts to make and understand film, is able to establish many principles and build theories about human visual representation in general.

List of visual anthropology academic programs
 Aarhus University: Master in Visual Anthropology
 Australian National University: The Research School of Humanities and the Arts Centre for Visual Anthropology
 California State University, Chico: Home to the Advanced Laboratory for Visual Anthropology (ALVA)  which offers students use of RED Digital Cinema cameras  in its Masters of Anthropology program. Students receive a four-fields degree but complete an ethnographic film as partial fulfillment of their thesis requirement. A Certificate in Applied Anthropology is also available for students who would like to pursue Visual Anthropology, and make ethnographic films as Undergraduates.
Facultad Latinoamericana de Ciencias Sociales Ecuador: offers a master program in visual anthropology.
Free University of Berlin: - M.A. in Visual and Media Anthropology.
Harvard University: Harvard offers a PhD in Social Anthropology with Media in conjunction with its Sensory Ethnography Lab
Heidelberg University: The chair of Visual and Media Anthropology offers BA and MA courses in the field of visual and media anthropology.
New York University: The Program in Culture and Media
Pontifical Catholic University of Peru: The Social Sciences Department at PUCP offers a two-year MA program in Visual Anthropology.
 San Francisco State University: Visual Anthropology program and Peter Biella
Tallinn University: MA in audiovisual ethnography. 
Towson University: Undergraduate track in Anthropology-Sociology, Matthew Durington, Samuel Collins and Harjant Gill 
Universidad Autónoma Metropolitana: Laboratorio de Antropología Visual (LAV)
Universitat de Barcelona:  Postgraduate and Master's programs in Visual Anthropology
University of British Columbia: The Ethnographic Film Unit at UBC
University College London: offers postgraduate courses that can be taken as part of a master's degree for credit or they can be audited with a certificate of completion provided.
University of Kent: The Department of Anthropology offers a Masters in Visual Anthropology that explores traditional and experimental means of using visual images to produce/represent anthropological knowledge. Note (Nov 2020): this is no longer offered. Link is to web archive version.
University of Leiden: offers the Bachelor course Visual Methods and Visual Ethnography as a Method as part the Master's programme. It teaches students how to use photography, digital video and sound recording both as research and reporting tools as part of ethnographic research.
University of London, Goldsmiths College: The anthropology department offers a BA, an MA , and PhD in Visual Anthropology.
University of Manchester: The Granada Centre for Visual Anthropology offers MA, MPhil and PhD courses that combine practical film training, editing and production, photography, sound recording, art and social activism. Established in 1987, the Granada Centre's postgraduate programme has produced over 300 documentary films. Its students have made films for numerous international broadcasters, including the BBC and Channel 4. Manchester includes an Oscar nominee, two BAFTA winners, and a BAFTA nominee among its alumni. 
University of Münster: Visual Anthropology, Media & Documentary Practices Programme which accompanies employment. Master of Arts (M.A.) degree within 6 semesters. Provides skills in the area of visual anthropology, documentary films, photography, documentary art, culture media and media anthropology. 
University of New South Wales: offers a PhD in Visual Anthropology 
University of Oxford: The Institute of Social & Cultural Anthropology collaborates with the Pitt Rivers Museum to offer the highly ranked one-year MSc and two-year MPhil in Visual, Material, and Museum Anthropology and also awards DPhil degrees with numerous competitive funding opportunities. 
 University of South Carolina offers a Graduate Certificate in Visual Anthropology for graduate students enrolled in M.A. or Ph.D. programs in Media Arts and Anthropology but which also serves graduate students in such areas as Education, the Department of Languages, Literatures, and Cultures, as well as Sociology and Geography.
 University of Southern California - USC Center for Visual Anthropology: The MAVA (Master of Arts in Visual Anthropology) was a 2–3 year terminal Masters program from 1984 to 2001, which produced over sixty ethnographic documentaries. In 2001, it was merged into a Certificate in Visual Anthropology given alongside the Ph.D. in Anthropology. A new digitally based program was created in the Fall of 2009 as a new one year MA program in Visual Anthropology. Since 2009, the program has produced twenty five new ethnographic documentaries.  Many have screened at film festivals and several are in distribution.
University of Tromsø: The University of Tromsø offers a program in Visual Culture Studies
Western Kentucky University: Western Kentucky University offers a BA in Cultural Anthropology with a focus on Visual Anthropology
Westfälische Wilhelms-Universität Münster (University of Münster): Visual Anthropology, Media & Documentary Practices Programme which accompanies employment. Master of Arts (M.A.) degree within 6 semesters. Provides skills in the area of visual anthropology, documentary films, photography, documentary art, culture media and media anthropology.

List of films

See also
 Ethnofiction
 Ethnographic film
 Gregory Bateson
 John Collier Jr.
 Multimodal Anthropology
 Visual Anthropology (journal)
 Visual sociology

References

Bibliography
 Alloa, Emmanuel (ed.) Penser l'image II. Anthropologies du visuel. Dijon: Presses du réel 2015.  (in French).
 Banks, Marcus; Morphy, Howard (Hrsg.): Rethinking Visual Anthropology. New Haven: Yale University Press 1999. 
Marcus Banks and  David Zeitlyn, 2015. "Visual methods in social research" (Second Edition), Sage: London
 Barbash, Ilisa and Lucien Taylor. Cross-cultural Filmmaking: A Handbook for Making Documentary and Ethnographic Films and Videos. Berkeley: University of California Press, 1997.
 Collier, Malcolm et al.: Visual Anthropology. Photography As a Research Method. University of Mexico 1986. 
Daniels, Inge. 2010. The Japanese House: Material Culture in the Modern Home. Oxford: Berg Publishers.
Coote, Jeremy and Anthony Shelton. 1994. Anthropology, Art and Aesthetics. Clarendon Press.
Edwards, Elisabeth (Hrsg.): Anthropology and Photography 1860–1920. New Haven, London 1994, Nachdruck. 
Engelbrecht, Beate (ed.). Memories of the Origins of Ethnographic Film. Frankfurt am Main et al.: Peter Lang Verlag, 2007.
Grimshaw, Anna. The Ethnographer's Eye: Ways of Seeing in Modern Anthropology. Cambridge: Cambridge University Press, 2001.
Harris, Claire. 2012. The Museum on the Roof of the World: Art, Politics and the Representation of Tibet. University of Chicago Press.
Harris, Claire and Michael O'Hanlon. 2013. 'The Future of the Ethnographic Museum,' Anthropology Today, 29(1). pp. 8–12.
Heider, Karl G. Ethnographic Film (Revised Edition). Austin: University of Texas Press, 2006.
Hockings, Paul (ed.). "Principles of Visual Anthropology." 3rd edn. Berlin: Mouton de Gruyter, 2003.
MacDougall, David. Transcultural Cinema. Princeton: Princeton University Press, 1998.
 Martinez, Wilton. 1992. “Who Constructs Anthropological Knowledge? Toward a Theory of Ethnographic Film Spectatorship.” In Film as Ethnography, D. Turton and P. Crawford, (Eds.), pp. 130–161. Manchester: Manchester University Press.
 Mead, Margaret: Anthropology and the camera. In: Morgan, Willard D. (Hg.): Encyclopedia of photography. New York 1963.
Morton, Chris and Elizabeth Edwards (eds.) 2009. Photography, Anthropology and History: Expanding the Frame. Farnham: Ashgate Publishing
 Peers, Laura. 2003. Museums and Source Communities: A Routledge Reader, Routledge
 Pink, Sarah: Doing Visual Ethnography: Images, Media and Representation in Research. London: Sage Publications Ltd. 2006. 
 Pinney, Christopher: Photography and Anthropology. London: Reaktion Books 2011. 
Prins, Harald E.L. "Visual Anthropology." pp. 506–525. In A Companion to the Anthropology of American Indians. Ed. T. Biolsi. Oxford: Blackwell Publishing, 2004.
Prins, Harald E.L., and Ruby, Jay eds. "The Origins of Visual Anthropology." Visual Anthropology Review. Vol. 17 (2), 2001–2002.
Ruby, Jay. Picturing Culture: Essays on Film and Anthropology. Chicago: University of Chicago Press, 2000, .
Worth, Sol, Adair John. "Through Navajo Eyes". Indiana University Press; 1972.

Further reading 
 Visual Anthropology - Encyclopedia of Cultural Anthropology, article by Jay Ruby
 Visual anthropology in the digital mirror: Computer-assisted visual anthropology, article by Michael D. Fischer and David Zeitlyn, then both University of Kent at Canterbury
 Legends Asch and Myerhoff Inspire A New Generation of Visual Anthropologists - article by Susan Andrews 
 Pink, Sarah. "Doing Visual Ethnography:Images, Media, and Representation". Sage, London, 2012
Banks, Marcus and Ruby, Jay. "Made to be Seen: Perspectives on the History of Visual Anthropology. University of Chicago Press, 2011

External links
 Organizations
 European Association of Social Anthropologists Visual Anthropology Network
 SVA Society for Visual Anthropology
 Center for Visual Anthropology of Peru / Centro de Antropología Visual del Perú - CAVP

 Publications
 Visual Anthropology Review
 Visual Anthropology (journal)

 Resources
 VisualAnthropology.net
 OVERLAP: Laboratory of Visual Anthropology
 Visual Anthropology Archive
 Visual Anthropology Films & Educational Resource Library
 Royal Anthropological Institute, Ethnographic Film
 National Anthropological Archives and Human Studies Film Archives - collect and preserve historical and contemporary anthropological materials that document the world's cultures and the history of anthropology.
 Audio-Visual Resources (from the website of Prof. Alessandro Duranti, anthropology department, UCLA)
 Films of anthropological and other "ancestors"
 A kiosk of films and sounds in Ethnomusicology - Robert Garfias
 Documentary Educational Resources (Visual Anthropology Films & Filmmakers)
 Documentary "El mal visto". Interpretation about the evil eye from the visual anthropology.
 Visual anthtropology (Chinese)
 Articles on Fieldwork
 The Ovahimba Years Collection
 Visual Anthropology of Japan
 Artpologist an Art project using Art and Anthropology 
 Ethnographic Terminalia - A curatorial collective and exhibition series.

 
Photography by genre